The 1927 Colorado Agricultural Aggies football team represented Colorado Agricultural College (now known as Colorado State University) in the Rocky Mountain Conference (RMC) during the 1927 college football season.  In their 15th season under head coach Harry W. Hughes, the Aggies compiled a 7–1 record, won the RMC championship, and outscored all opponents by a total of 176 to 26.

Six Colorado Agricultural players received all-conference honors in 1927: fullback Rollie Caldwell, guard Lynn Pitcher, end Glen Davis, halfback Fay Rankin, center Carlyle Vickers, and guard Ed Graves.

Schedule

References

Colorado Agricultural
Colorado State Rams football seasons
Rocky Mountain Athletic Conference football champion seasons
Colorado Agricultural Aggies football